The 1960–61 Cincinnati Bearcats men's basketball team represented University of Cincinnati. Cincinnati won the Missouri Valley Conference regular season title and the NCAA tournament, defeating Ohio State 70–65 in the Championship Game in Kansas City, Missouri. The team's head coach was Ed Jucker, his first year at the helm.

Roster

Schedule

|-
!colspan=12 style=|Regular Season

|-
!colspan=12 style=|NCAA Tournament

Rankings

Awards and honors

All-American
Honorable Mention: Paul Hogue
Honorable Mention: Bob Wiesenhahn

Missouri Valley Conference honors

All-MVC Awards
Coach of the Year: Ed Jucker

All-MVC
Paul Hogue
Tom Thacker
Bob Wiesenhahn

Team players drafted into the NBA Draft

References

Cincinnati
Cincinnati Bearcats men's basketball seasons
NCAA Division I men's basketball tournament championship seasons
NCAA Division I men's basketball tournament Final Four seasons
Cincinnati
Cincinnati Bearcats men's basketball team
Cincinnati Bearcats men's basketball team